In marketing, a product is an object, or system, or service made available for consumer use as of the consumer demand; it is anything that can be offered to a market to satisfy the desire or need of a customer. In retailing, products are often referred to as merchandise, and in manufacturing, products are bought as raw materials and then sold as finished goods. A service is also regarded as a type of product.

In project management, products are the formal definition of the project deliverables that make up or contribute to delivering the objectives of the project. 

A related concept is that of a sub-product, a secondary but useful result of a production process.

Dangerous products, particularly physical ones, that cause injuries to consumers or bystanders may be subject to product liability.

Product classification
A product can be classified as tangible or intangible. A tangible product is an actual physical object that can be perceived by touch such as a building, vehicle, gadget, or clothing. An intangible product is a product that can only be perceived indirectly such as an insurance policy. Services can be broadly classified under intangible products, which can be durable or nondurable.

By use
In its online product catalog, retailer Sears, Roebuck and Company divides its products into "departments", then presents products to potential shoppers according to (1) function or (2) brand. Each product has a Sears item number and a manufacturer's model number. Sears uses the departments and product groupings with the intention of helping customers browse products by function or brand within a traditional department-store structure.

By association
A product line is "a group of products that are closely related, either because they function in a similar manner, are sold to the same customer groups, are marketed through the same types of outlets, or fall within given price ranges."
Many businesses offer a range of product lines which may be unique to a single organisation or may be common across the business's industry. In 2002 the US Census compiled revenue figures for the finance and insurance industry by various product lines such as "accident, health and medical insurance premiums" and "income from secured consumer loans". Within the insurance industry, product lines are indicated by the type of risk coverage, such as auto insurance, commercial insurance and life insurance.

National and international product classifications
Various classification systems for products have been developed for economic statistical purposes. The NAFTA signatories are working on a system that classifies products called NAPCS as a companion to the North American Industry Classification System (NAICS). The European Union uses a "Classification of Products by Activity" among other product classifications. The United Nations also classifies products for international economic activity reporting.

The Aspinwall Classification System  classifies and rates products based on five variables:
 Replacement rate (How frequently is the product repurchased?)
 Gross margin (How much profit is obtained from each product?)
 Buyer goal adjustment (How flexible are the buyers' purchasing habits with regard to this product?)
 Duration of product satisfaction (How long will the product produce benefits for the user?)
 Duration of buyer search behavior (How long will consumers shop for the product?)

The National Institute of Governmental Purchasing (NIGP) developed a commodity and services classification system for use by state and local governments, the NIGP Code.  The NIGP Code is used by 33 states within the United States as well as thousands of cities, counties and political subdivisions.  The NIGP Code is a hierarchical schema consisting of a 3 digit class, 5 digit class-item, 7 digit class-item-group, and an 11 digit class-item-group-detail.  Applications of the NIGP Code include vendor registration, inventory item identification, contract item management, spend analysis, and strategic sourcing.

Product model 

A manufacturer usually provides an  identifier for each particular type of product they make, known as a model, model variant, or model number (often abbreviated as MN, M/N or model no., and sometimes as M- or Mk). For example, Dyson Ltd, a manufacturer of appliances (mainly vacuum cleaners), requires customers to identify their model in the support section of the website. Brand and model can be used together to identify products in the market. The model number is not necessarily the same as the manufacturer part number (MPN).

Because of the huge amount of similar products in the automotive industry, there is a special kind of defining a car with options (marks, attributes) that represent the characteristics features of the vehicle. A model of a car is defined by some basic options like body, engine, gearbox, and axles. The variants of a model (often called the trim levels) are built by some additional options like color, seats, wheels, mirrors, other trims, entertainment and assistant systems, etc. Options, that exclude each other (pairwise) build an option family. That means that you can choose only one option for each family and you have to choose exactly one option.

In addition, a specific unit of a product is often (and in some contexts must be) identified by a serial number, which is necessary to distinguish products with the same product definition. In the case of automotive products, it is called the vehicle identification number (VIN), an internationally standardised format.

Product information

Product information, beyond currency price information, can include:

Many of these types of product information are regulated to some degree, such as to some degree prohibiting false or misleading product information or requiring sellers or manufacturers to specify various information such as ingredients of food-, pharmaceutical- and hygiene-products. There also is standardization. Marketing to entice the shopper is often prioritized over accurate, high-quality or extensive and relevant information.

Product information is often a key element in the buyer decision process. Relevant factors include trust in the accuracy of the information and social normative pressure. Easily accessible and up-to-date medicinal product information can contribute to the health literacy. Online shopping is usually more informationally rich than shopping at physical stores traveled to and usually has higher comparability and customizability.

Production information-related developments can be useful for enabling, facilitating, or shifting towards sustainable consumption and support more sustainable products. Environmental life-cycle assessment (LCA) has been widely used for to assess environmental impacts across the life cycle of products. There are LCA datasets that assess all products in some supermarkets in a standardized way. Consumers may seek reliable information to evaluate relevant characteristics of products such as durability and reliability. Development of 'transparency by design' scenarios have been suggested to "complement the physical product with layers of digital information", improving transparency and traceability (T&T). The app CodeCheck gives some smartphone users some capability to scan products for assessed ingredients. Many labels are considered to be flawed and few have the time to "study the true environmental impact of every purchase". Full product transparency is a concept of making the full life-cycle impacts public. An important element that is required for various product information is supply chain transparency, which relates to human rights and supply chain sustainability.

Produce traceability

Product passports
In the EU, under the renewed Sustainable Product Policy Initiative, the inclusion of a Digital Product Passport has been proposed. A material passport is a document consisting of all the materials that are included in a product or construction. It consists of a set of data describing defined characteristics of materials in products, useful for recovery, recycling, re-use and various evaluations. They may contribute to a more circular economy.

Product information management

See also
 Builder's plate
 List of fastest-selling products
 Manufacturer part number
 Product teardown

References

Further reading

External links

Business terms